In computer science, the prefix sum, cumulative sum, inclusive scan, or simply scan of a sequence of numbers  is a second sequence of numbers , the sums of prefixes (running totals) of the input sequence:

...

For instance, the prefix sums of the natural numbers are the triangular numbers:
{| class="wikitable"
|-
!input numbers
|  1 ||  2 ||  3 ||  4 ||  5 ||  6 || ...
|-
!prefix sums
|  1 ||  3 ||  6 || 10 || 15 || 21 || ...
|}

Prefix sums are trivial to compute in sequential models of computation, by using the formula  to compute each output value in sequence order. However, despite their ease of computation, prefix sums are a useful primitive in certain algorithms such as counting sort,
and they form the basis of the scan higher-order function in functional programming languages. Prefix sums have also been much studied in parallel algorithms, both as a test problem to be solved and as a useful primitive to be used as a subroutine in other parallel algorithms.

Abstractly, a prefix sum requires only a binary associative operator ⊕, making it useful for many applications from calculating well-separated pair decompositions of points to string processing.

Mathematically, the operation of taking prefix sums can be generalized from finite to infinite sequences; in that context, a prefix sum is known as a partial sum of a series. Prefix summation or partial summation form linear operators on the vector spaces of finite or infinite sequences; their inverses are finite difference operators.

Scan higher order function

In functional programming terms, the prefix sum may be generalized to any binary operation (not just the addition operation); the higher order function resulting from this generalization is called a scan, and it is closely related to the fold operation. Both the scan and the fold operations apply the given binary operation to the same sequence of values, but differ in that the scan returns the whole sequence of results from the binary operation, whereas the fold returns only the final result. For instance, the sequence of factorial numbers may be generated by a scan of the natural numbers using multiplication instead of addition:
{| class="wikitable" style="text-align:right;"
|-
!input numbers
|  1 ||  2 ||  3 ||  4 ||   5 ||   6 || ...
|-
!prefix products
|  1 ||  2 ||  6 || 24 || 120 || 720 || ...
|}

Inclusive and exclusive scans

Programming language and library implementations of scan may be either inclusive or exclusive. An inclusive scan includes input  when computing output  (i.e.) while an exclusive scan does not (i.e.). In the latter case, implementations either leave  undefined or accept a separate "" value with which to seed the scan. Either type of scan can be transformed into the other: an inclusive scan can be transformed into an exclusive scan by shifting the array produced by the scan right by one element and inserting the identity value at the left of the array. Conversely, an exclusive scan be transformed into an inclusive scan by shifting the array produced by the scan left and inserting the sum of the last element of the scan and the last element of the input array at the right of the array.

The following table lists examples of the inclusive and exclusive scan functions provided by a few programming languages and libraries:

Parallel algorithms

There are two key algorithms for computing a prefix sum in parallel. The first offers a shorter span and more parallelism but is not work-efficient. The second is work-efficient but requires double the span and offers less parallelism. These are presented in turn below.

Algorithm 1: Shorter span, more parallel

Hillis and Steele present the
following parallel prefix sum algorithm:
 for i <- 0 to floor(log2(n)) do
   for j <- 0 to n - 1 do in parallel
     if j < 2i then
       x <- x
     else
       x <- x + x

In the above, the notation  means the value of the th element of array  in timestep .

With a single processor this algorithm would run in  time. However if the machine has at least  processors to perform the inner loop in parallel, the algorithm as a whole runs in  time, the number of iterations of the outer loop.

Algorithm 2: Work-efficient

A work-efficient parallel prefix sum can be computed by the following steps.
Recursively compute the prefix sum  of the sequence 
After the first value, each successive number  is either copied from a position half as far through the  sequence, or is the previous value added to one value in the  sequence.

Discussion

Each of the preceding algorithms runs in  time. However, the former takes exactly  steps, while the latter requires  steps. For the 16-input examples illustrated, Algorithm 1 is 12-way parallel (49 units of work divided by a span of 4) while Algorithm 2 is only 4-way parallel (26 units of work divided by a span of 6). However, Algorithm 2 is work-efficient—it performs only a constant factor (2) of the amount of work required by the sequential algorithm—while Algorithm 1 is work-inefficient—it performs asymptotically more work (a logarithmic factor) than is required sequentially. Consequently, Algorithm 1 is likely to perform better when abundant parallelism is available, but Algorithm 2 is likely to perform better when parallelism is more limited.

Parallel algorithms for prefix sums can often be generalized to other scan operations on associative binary operations, and they can also be computed efficiently on modern parallel hardware such as a GPU. The idea of building in hardware a functional unit dedicated to computing multi-parameter prefix-sum was patented by Uzi Vishkin.

Many parallel implementations follow a two pass procedure where partial prefix sums are calculated in the first pass on each processing unit; the prefix sum of these partial sums is then calculated and broadcast back to the processing units for a second pass using the now known prefix as the initial value. Asymptotically this method takes approximately two read operations and one write operation per item.

Concrete implementations of prefix sum algorithms

An implementation of a parallel prefix sum algorithm, like other parallel algorithms, has to take the parallelization architecture of the platform into account. More specifically, multiple algorithms exist which are adapted for platforms working on shared memory as well as algorithms which are well suited for platforms using distributed memory, relying on message passing as the only form of interprocess communication.

Shared memory: Two-level algorithm
The following algorithm assumes a shared memory machine model; all processing elements (PEs) have access to the same memory. A version of this algorithm is implemented in the Multi-Core Standard Template Library (MCSTL), a parallel implementation of the C++ standard template library which provides adapted versions for parallel computing of various algorithms.

In order to concurrently calculate the prefix sum over  data elements with  processing elements, the data is divided into  blocks, each containing  elements (for simplicity we assume that  divides ). Note, that although the algorithm divides the data into  blocks, only  processing elements run in parallel at a time.

In a first sweep, each PE calculates a local prefix sum for its block. The last block does not need to be calculated, since these prefix sums are only calculated as offsets to the prefix sums of succeeding blocks and the last block is by definition not succeeded.

The  offsets which are stored in the last position of each block are accumulated in a prefix sum of their own and stored in their succeeding positions. For  being a small number, it is faster to do this sequentially, for a large , this step could be done in parallel as well.

A second sweep is performed. This time the first block does not have to be processed, since it does not need to account for the offset of a preceding block. However, in this sweep the last block is included instead and the prefix sums for each block are calculated taking the prefix sum block offsets calculated in the previous sweep into account.

function prefix_sum(elements) {
    n := size(elements)
    p := number of processing elements
    prefix_sum := [0...0] of size n
    
    do parallel i = 0 to p-1 {
        // i := index of current PE
        from j = i * n / (p+1) to (i+1) * n / (p+1) - 1 do {
            // This only stores the prefix sum of the local blocks
            store_prefix_sum_with_offset_in(elements, 0, prefix_sum)
        }
    }
    
    x = 0
    
    for i = 1 to p {                        // Serial accumulation of total sum of blocks 
        x +=  prefix_sum[i * n / (p+1) - 1] // Build the prefix sum over the first p blocks
        prefix_sum[i * n / (p+1)] = x       // Save the results to be used as offsets in second sweep
    }
    
    do parallel i = 1 to p {
        // i := index of current PE
        from j = i * n / (p+1) to (i+1) * n / (p+1) - 1 do {
            offset := prefix_sum[i * n / (p+1)]
            // Calculate the prefix sum taking the sum of preceding blocks as offset
            store_prefix_sum_with_offset_in(elements, offset, prefix_sum)
        }
    }
    
    return prefix_sum
}

Improvement: In case that the number of blocks are too much that makes the serial step time-consuming by deploying a single processor, the Hillis and Steele algorithm can be used to accelerate the second phase.

Distributed memory: Hypercube algorithm
The Hypercube Prefix Sum Algorithm is well adapted for distributed memory platforms and works with the exchange of messages between the processing elements. It assumes to have  processor elements (PEs) participating in the algorithm equal to the number of corners in a -dimensional hypercube.

Throughout the algorithm, each PE is seen as a corner in a hypothetical hyper cube with knowledge of the total prefix sum  as well as the prefix sum  of all elements up to itself (according to the ordered indices among the PEs), both in its own hypercube.

 The algorithm goes on by unifying hypercubes which are adjacent along one dimension. During each unification,  is exchanged and aggregated between the two hyper cubes which keeps the invariant that all PEs at corners of this new hyper cube store the total prefix sum of this newly unified hyper cube in their variable . However, only the hyper cube containing the PEs with higher index also adds this  to their local variable , keeping the invariant that  only stores the value of the prefix sum of all elements at PEs with indices smaller or equal to their own index.

In a -dimensional hyper cube with  PEs at the corners, the algorithm has to be repeated  times to have the zero-dimensional hyper cubes be unified into one -dimensional hyper cube.

i := Index of own processor element (PE)
m := prefix sum of local elements of this PE
d := number of dimensions of the hyper cube

x = m;     // Invariant: The prefix sum up to this PE in the current sub cube
σ = m;     // Invariant: The prefix sum of all elements in the current sub cube

for (k=0; k <= d-1; k++) {
    y = σ @ PE(i xor 2^k)  // Get the total prefix sum of the opposing sub cube along dimension k
    σ = σ + y              // Aggregate the prefix sum of both sub cubes

    if (i & 2^k) {
        x = x + y  // Only aggregate the prefix sum from the other sub cube, if this PE is the higher index one.
    }
}

Large message sizes: pipelined binary tree
The Pipelined Binary Tree Algorithm is another algorithm for distributed memory platforms which is specifically well suited for large message sizes.

Like the hypercube algorithm, it assumes a special communication structure. The processing elements (PEs) are hypothetically arranged in a binary tree (e.g. a Fibonacci Tree) with infix numeration according to their index within the PEs. Communication on such a tree always occurs between parent and child nodes.

The parent's index is greater than any of the indices in PEj's subtree if PEj is a left child and smaller if PEj is a right child. 
This allows for the following reasoning:

 The local prefix sum  of the left subtree has to be aggregated to calculate PEj's local prefix sum .
 The local prefix sum  of the right subtree has to be aggregated to calculate the local prefix sum of higher level PEh which are reached on a path containing a left children connection (which means ).
 The total prefix sum  of PEj is necessary to calculate the total prefix sums in the right subtree (e.g.  for the highest index node in the subtree).
 PEj needs to include the total prefix sum  of the first higher order node which is reached via an upward path including a right children connection to calculate its total prefix sum.

Note the distinction between subtree-local and total prefix sums. The points two, three and four can lead to believe they would form a circular dependency, but this is not the case. Lower level PEs might require the total prefix sum of higher level PEs to calculate their total prefix sum, but higher level PEs only require subtree local prefix sums to calculate their total prefix sum. The root node as highest level node only requires the local prefix sum of its left subtree to calculate its own prefix sum. Each PE on the path from PE0 to the root PE only requires the local prefix sum of its left subtree to calculate its own prefix sum, whereas every node on the path from PEp-1 (last PE) to the PEroot requires the total prefix sum of its parent to calculate its own total prefix sum.

This leads to a two-phase algorithm:

Upward PhasePropagate the subtree local prefix sum  to its parent for each PEj.

Downward phasePropagate the exclusive (exclusive PEj as well as the PEs in its left subtree) total prefix sum  of all lower index PEs which are not included in the addressed subtree of PEj to lower level PEs in the left child subtree of PEj. Propagate the inclusive prefix sum  to the right child subtree of PEj.

Note that the algorithm is run in parallel at each PE and the PEs will block upon receive until their children/parents provide them with packets.

k := number of packets in a message m of a PE
m @ {left, right, parent, this} := // Messages at the different PEs

x = m @ this

// Upward phase - Calculate subtree local prefix sums
for j=0 to k-1: // Pipelining: For each packet of a message
    if hasLeftChild:
        blocking receive m[j] @ left // This replaces the local m[j] with the received m[j]
        // Aggregate inclusive local prefix sum from lower index PEs
        x[j] = m[j] ⨁ x[j]

    if hasRightChild:
        blocking receive m[j] @ right
        // We do not aggregate m[j] into the local prefix sum, since the right children are higher index PEs
        send x[j] ⨁ m[j] to parent
    else:
        send x[j] to parent

// Downward phase
for j=0 to k-1:
    m[j] @ this = 0

    if hasParent:
        blocking receive m[j] @ parent
        // For a left child m[j] is the parents exclusive prefix sum, for a right child the inclusive prefix sum
        x[j] = m[j] ⨁ x[j] 
    
    send m[j] to left  // The total prefix sum of all PE's smaller than this or any PE in the left subtree
    send x[j] to right // The total prefix sum of all PE's smaller or equal than this PE

Pipelining
If the message  of length  can be divided into  packets and the operator ⨁ can be used on each of the corresponding message packets separately, pipelining is possible.

If the algorithm is used without pipelining, there are always only two levels (the sending PEs and the receiving PEs) of the binary tree at work while all other PEs are waiting.

However, in between, all the PEs along the path can work in parallel and each third communication operation (receive left, receive right, send to parent) sends a packet to the next level, so that one phase can be completed in  communication operations and both phases together need  which is favourable for large message sizes .

The algorithm can further be optimised by making use of full-duplex or telephone model communication and overlapping the upward and the downward phase.

Data structures
When a data set may be updated dynamically, it may be stored in a Fenwick tree data structure. This structure allows both the lookup of any individual prefix sum value and the modification of any array value in logarithmic time per operation. However, an earlier 1982 paper  presents a data structure called Partial Sums Tree (see Section 5.1) that appears to overlap Fenwick trees; in 1982 the term prefix-sum was not yet as common as it is today.

For higher-dimensional arrays, the summed area table provides a data structure based on prefix sums for computing sums of arbitrary rectangular subarrays. This can be a helpful primitive in image convolution operations.

Applications
Counting sort is an integer sorting algorithm that uses the prefix sum of a histogram of key frequencies to calculate the position of each key in the sorted output array. It runs in linear time for integer keys that are smaller than the number of items, and is frequently used as part of radix sort, a fast algorithm for sorting integers that are less restricted in magnitude.

List ranking, the problem of transforming a linked list into an array that represents the same sequence of items, can be viewed as computing a prefix sum on the sequence 1, 1, 1, ... and then mapping each item to the array position given by its prefix sum value; by combining list ranking, prefix sums, and Euler tours, many important problems on trees may be solved by efficient parallel algorithms.

An early application of parallel prefix sum algorithms was in the design of binary adders, Boolean circuits that can add two -bit binary numbers. In this application, the sequence of carry bits of the addition can be represented as a scan operation
on the sequence of pairs of input bits, using the majority function to combine the previous carry with these two bits. Each bit of the output number can then be found as the exclusive or of two input bits with the corresponding carry bit. By using a circuit that performs the operations of the parallel prefix sum algorithm, it is possible to design an adder that uses  logic gates and  time steps.

In the parallel random access machine model of computing, prefix sums can be used to simulate parallel algorithms that assume the ability for multiple processors to access the same memory cell at the same time, on parallel machines that forbid simultaneous access. By means of a sorting network, a set of parallel memory access requests can be ordered into a sequence such that accesses to the same cell are contiguous within the sequence; scan operations can then be used to determine which of the accesses succeed in writing to their requested cells, and to distribute the results of memory read operations to multiple processors that request the same result.

In Guy Blelloch's Ph.D. thesis, parallel prefix operations form part of the formalization of the data parallelism model provided by machines such as the Connection Machine. The Connection Machine CM-1 and CM-2 provided a hypercubic network on which the Algorithm 1 above could be implemented, whereas the CM-5 provided a dedicated network to implement Algorithm 2.

The reverse operation, decoding a Gray-coded value  into a binary number, is more complicated, but can be expressed as the prefix sum of the bits of , where each summation operation within the prefix sum is performed modulo two.

Parallel prefix (using multiplication as the underlying associative operation) can also be used to build fast algorithms for parallel polynomial interpolation. In particular, it can be used to compute the divided difference coefficients of the Newton form of the interpolation polynomial. 
This prefix based approach can also be used to obtain the generalized divided differences for (confluent) Hermite interpolation
as well as for parallel algorithms for Vandermonde systems.

See also 
 General-purpose computing on graphics processing units
 Segmented scan
 Summed-area table

References

External links

Concurrent algorithms
Higher-order functions